"The Steps" is a song by American pop rock band Haim from their third studio album Women in Music Pt. III (2020). It was written by band members Alana Haim, Este Haim and Danielle Haim with Rostam Batmanglij and Ariel Rechtshaid; the latter three also produced it. The single was released by Columbia Records on March 3, 2020 alongside the album's pre-order.

The track was regarded by several critics as one of the best songs of 2020 and was nominated for Best Rock Performance at the 63rd Grammy Awards.

Writing and production
The Haim sisters worked with frequent collaborators Rostam Batmanglij and Ariel Rechtshaid for their third studio album Women in Music Pt. III. A week before turning in the album, they wrote "The Steps" in a day. The band members wanted to create an up-tempo song that could allow them to do a great performance and decided to work on a "bare-bone" rock song. The writing process for this track was different from the band's previous work, as they usually compose the melody before writing the lyrics. But for "The Steps", they created both at the same time after they started to scream the line "you don't understand me."

Danielle Haim provided the main vocals for "The Steps" and played the drums and guitar, Este Haim played the bass and Alana Haim played the acoustic guitar and recorded backing vocals. Cass McCombs also played guitar on the track.

Music and lyrics
"The Steps" is a guitar-driven love song. It mixes elements of pop, country and alternative. Danielle Haim described the riff as "tough and straight to the point."

Release and promotion
On March 2, 2020, Haim unveiled the cover art, title and scheduled released date of their third studio album through their social medias. They also announced that their next single, "The Steps", would be released the following day alongside the album's pre-order. The song premiered on Annie Mac's radio show on BBC Radio 1 as the host's "Hottest Record in the World." The same month, Danielle Haim filmed a guitar tutorial for BBC Radio 1's Music Lessons.

Critical reception

Accolades
"The Steps" was nominated for Best Rock Performance at the 63rd Grammy Awards while its parent album was nominated for Album of the Year.

Year-end lists

Music video
The music video for "The Steps" was released alongside the song on March 3, 2020. It was directed by Paul Thomas Anderson and Danielle Haim.

Live performances
Haim performed "The Steps" live for the first time on The Tonight Show Starring Jimmy Fallon on March 9, 2020, alongside three backing musicians. The following day, Haim embarked on their Deli Tour, a five-shows promotional tour sponsored by American Express. The tracklist consisted of five songs, including "The Steps" performed by the band with its co-producer and co-writer Rostam Batmanglij. Their Los Angeles performance at Canter's was filmed by Paul Thomas Anderson and posted online in June 2020.

The single was part of a three-songs set performed in May 2020 by Danielle Haim for Rolling Stone's "In My Room" series. After playing an electric guitar when she sang "Don't Wanna" and "Summer Girl", she switched to an acoustic guitar for "The Steps". The following month, on June 17, the band did a Tiny Desk Concert for NPR. The three members performed from their respective Silver Lake homes. They opened their set with "The Steps" while playing a guitar, a bass and bongos. They followed it with "I Know Alone" before American saxophonist Henry Solomon joined them for the last song of the set, "Summer Girl".

On October 24, 2020, Haim performed "The Steps" and "Summer Girl" at the 14th Go Campaign Gala and raised 10.000 dollars to help homeless UCLA students affected by the COVID-19 pandemic.

On March 14, 2021, the band performed the song at the 63rd Annual Grammy Awards.

Charts

Weekly Charts

Year-end charts

Release history

References

2020 singles
2020 songs
Haim (band) songs
Song recordings produced by Ariel Rechtshaid
Song recordings produced by Rostam Batmanglij
Songs written by Alana Haim
Songs written by Ariel Rechtshaid
Songs written by Danielle Haim
Songs written by Este Haim
Songs written by Rostam Batmanglij